William Crosbie is a Canadian engineer and transportation planner.

Background
Crosbie holds an honors bachelor's degree in electrical engineering from Queen's University in Kingston, Ontario, and a master's degree in security studies (homeland security and defense) from the Naval Postgraduate School in Monterey, California.

Career
Crosbie began his career with the Canadian Pacific Railway, where he worked for six years, designing and commissioning railway signal and communication systems in Canada and the United States. He began working at Amtrak in 2002, was interim president in 2008, and became chief operating officer until the position was eliminated in 2010. He then worked for Parsons Corporation and thereafter as CEO for SYSTRA. He was appointed Executive Director of New Jersey Transit in April 2016, but ultimately did not take up the position.

See also
 George Warrington
 James Weinstein

References 

Amtrak people
Living people
Transport engineers
NJ Transit people
Chief operating officers
Year of birth missing (living people)